Richard Mast (born March 23, 1951) is an American professional golfer who has played on the PGA Tour, Nationwide Tour, and Champions Tour.

Early life 
Mast was born in Bluffton, Ohio. He graduated from St. Petersburg Junior College in 1971 with a degree in business.

Professional career 
Mast turned pro in 1972. He played on the PGA Tour intermittently in the 1970s and early 1980s. He finished fourth in the 1985 qualifying school to earn his Tour card for 1986. He kept his card through the 1989 season when he finished 173rd on the money list and lost his card. The biggest impression he made in the majors was at the U.S. Open in 1988, where he was only one stroke off the lead after the first round; he went on to finish in a tie for 50th place.

Mast played the inaugural season of the Ben Hogan Tour (now Web.com Tour) in 1990 and won three times and finished third on the money list to regain his PGA Tour card for 1991. He played almost exclusively on the PGA Tour through 1994 when he again lost his card by finishing 131st on the money list. He played both tours from 1995 to 2001, picking up another Nike Tour (now Web.com Tour) win in 1999.

After turning 50 in 2001, Mast started playing on the Senior PGA Tour (now Champions Tour) and placed eighth in the 2001 qualifying school to earn full exempt status for 2002. He played full-time on the Champions Tour through 2007.

Mast's best finish on the PGA Tour was second at the 1992 Greater Milwaukee Open. His best finish on the Champions Tour was third at the 2006 Senior British Open, T-3 at the 2002 Turtle Bay Championship, and tied for third at the 2012 Senior British Open.

In January 2012, Mast won the Qualifying School for the European Seniors Tour.

Professional wins (4)

Nike Tour wins (4)

*Note: The 1990 Ben Hogan Gulf Coast Classic was shortened to 36 holes due to rain.

Nike Tour playoff record (1–0)

Results in major championships

CUT = missed the half-way cut
"T" indicates a tie for a place
Note: Mast never played in the Masters Tournament or The Open Championship.

See also
1973 PGA Tour Qualifying School graduates
Fall 1976 PGA Tour Qualifying School graduates
Fall 1978 PGA Tour Qualifying School graduates
1985 PGA Tour Qualifying School graduates
1991 PGA Tour Qualifying School graduates
1990 Ben Hogan Tour graduates
List of golfers with most Web.com Tour wins

References

External links

American male golfers
PGA Tour golfers
PGA Tour Champions golfers
European Senior Tour golfers
Korn Ferry Tour graduates
Golfers from Ohio
People from Bluffton, Ohio
1951 births
Living people